The Medicine Bar was a bar in Birmingham, England. Located in the Custard Factory in Digbeth, it has hosted many techno, acid jazz, funk and hip hop events. It started as a collaboration in the 1990s between the London Medicine bar and local hip hop DJ 'Simon Fat Head', who began his career at the Brothers and Sisters at the Coast to Coast club on Broad Street.

Substance (which evolved out of Amplified) is the longest running hip hop night in the bar, with DJs Roc1, Magoo, Chris Reid (also from Scratch in London) and MC Mad Flow. It has brought hip hop acts including Afrika Bambaata, De La Soul and Jeru the Damaja to Birmingham.

Leftfoot is the bar's main funk and soul night which is part run by ex Rockers Hi-Fi DJ Dick and Adam Regan (who now owns the Bull's Head bar in the birmingham suburb of Moseley). Leftfoot hosts many large acid Jazz type events with appearances from Gilles Peterson to Mr Scruff. Both nights feature live acts.

Other events to take place at the bar include breakdance and graffiti art shows. For a short period in 2006/07, the Medicine Bar hosted the Birmingham leg of Club NME.

Medicine Bar had a Martin Audio modular system installed by Ace Vintage Systems.

External links
reviews of Medicine bar
What's on at The Medicine Bar

Nightclubs in Birmingham, West Midlands